The following is an alphabetical list of education trade unions:


A
 NEA-Alaska
 Alliance of Concerned Teachers (Philippines)
 Alabama Education Association
 American Association of University Professors
 American Federation of Teachers
 Arizona Education Association
 Arkansas Education Association
 Association of Secondary Teachers, Ireland
 Association of Teachers and Lecturers
 Association of University Teachers
 Australian Education Union
 All ceylon union of Government English teachers
 All ceylon union of teachers
 All Primary Teachers Association

B
 British Columbia Teachers' Federation

C
 California School Employees Association
 California Teachers Association
 Ceylon Teachers Service Union
 Chicago Teachers Union
 Cincinnati Federation of Teachers
 Colorado Education Association
 Communications Workers of America
 Connecticut Education Association
 Ceylon Independent teachers service union

D 
 University of the District of Columbia Faculty Association/NEA
 Delaware State Education Association

E
 Educational Institute of Scotland
 Education International
 Education Minnesota

F
 Federal Education Association
 Federation of the National Education
 Florida Education Association

G
 Georgia Association of Educators
 Graduate Employees Together - University of Pennsylvania
 Graduate Employees and Students Organization
 Graduate Student Organizing Committee
 Graduate student unionization

H 
 Hawaii State Teachers Association

I
 Idaho Education Association
 Illinois Education Association-NEA
 Independent Education Union of Australia
 Indiana State Teachers Association
 Iowa State Education Association
 Irish National Teachers' Organisation

J
 Japan Teachers Union

K
 Kansas National Education Association
 Kentucky Education Association
 Korean Teachers & Education Workers' Union

L 
 Louisiana Association of Educators

M
 Maine Education Association
 Manitoba Teachers' Society
 Maryland State Education Association
 Massachusetts Teachers Association
 Michigan Education Association
 Education Minnesota
 Mississippi Association of Educators
 Missouri NEA
 MEA-MFT
 Muraqibeen-MSB Teachers Association

N
 National Association of Head Teachers
 National Association of Schoolmasters Union of Women Teachers
 National Association of Teachers in Further and Higher Education
 National Autonomous School Workers' Trade Union (Italy)
 National Education Association
 National Education Union
 National Teachers Association
 National Tertiary Education Union
 Nebraska State Education Association
 Nevada State Education Association
 Newark Teachers Association
 NEA-New Hampshire
 New Jersey Education Association
 NEA-New Mexico
 New South Wales Teachers Federation
 New York City Teachers Union (1916–1964), also "Teachers Union" and "TU"
 New York State United Teachers
 North Carolina Association of Educators
 North Dakota Education Association

O
 Ohio Education Association
 Ohio Federation of Teachers
 Oklahoma Education Association
 Ontario Secondary School Teachers' Federation
 Oregon Education Association

P
 Pennsylvania State Education Association
 Post-Primary Teachers Association of New Zealand (PPTA)
 Professional Educators of Tennessee

Q
 Queensland Teachers Union

R
 NEA Rhode Island or National Education Association Rhode Island
 Rhode Island Federation of Teachers and Health Professionals

S
 Saint Lucia Teachers' Union – SLTU
 Saskatchewan Teachers' Federation
 Scottish Secondary Teachers' Association
 Scranton Diocese Association of Catholic Teachers
 South Carolina Education Association
 South Dakota Education Association

T
 Tanzania Teachers’ Union
 Teachers' Federation of Puerto Rico
 Teachers Union (also "TU" and "New York City Teachers Union") (1916–1964)
 Teachers' Union of Ireland
 Temple University Graduate Students Association
 Tennessee Education Association
 Texas State Teachers Association

U
 UNITE HERE
 Undeb Cenedlaethol Athrawon Cymru
 Union of Women Teachers
 United Auto Workers
 United Federation of Teachers
 United Teachers of New Orleans
 University and College Union
 Utah Education Association
 Utah School Employees Association

V 
 Virginia Education Association
 Vermont-NEA

W 
 Washington Education Association
 Wisconsin Education Association Council
 West Virginia Education Association
 Wyoming Education Association

Notes 

 
Trade unions
Educations